Farah Momen (born 11 July 1990) is an Egyptian professional squash player who currently plays for Egypt women's national squash team. She achieved her highest career PSA singles ranking of 87 in March 2019 during the 2018-19 PSA World Tour.

References

External links 

 Profile at PSA
 

1990 births
Living people
Egyptian female squash players
Sportspeople from Cairo
21st-century Egyptian women